Francesco Burani was an Italian designer and engraver of the Baroque period. He was born at Reggio Emilia. He made an etching of Bacchus sitting with three Satyrs executed in the style of Jusepe Ribera.

References

People from Reggio Emilia
Italian engravers
Year of death unknown
Year of birth unknown